Als die Götter starben (When the Gods Died) is a 1963 science fiction novel by German author Günther Krupkat about contact between humans and an alien race from the distant planet "Meju." After the discovery of alien diaries on the Martian moon Phobos in the 21st century, a frame narrative tells the interconnected stories of human power struggles in ancient Mesopotamia and alien flight from a distant planet following a cataclysm. A 1989 poll ranked it as the seventh most popular East German science fiction novel.

References

Bibliography

 Fritzsche, Sonja. Science Fiction Literature in East Germany. Oxford; New York: Lang, 2006. 
 Neumann, Hans-Peter. Die grosse illustrierte Bibliographie der Science Fiction in der DDR. Berlin: Shayol, 2002.
 Steinmüller, Angela and Karlheinz. Vorgriff auf das Lichte Morgen. Passau: Erster Deutscher Fantasy Club, 1995.

1963 German novels
1963 science fiction novels
German science fiction novels
East German novels
Fiction set on Phobos (moon)
Novels about extraterrestrial life
Ancient Mesopotamia in popular culture